Göztepe station is a historical railway station in Kadıköy, Istanbul. Between 1969 and 2013, it was a station on the Haydarpaşa suburban railway line to Gebze. A modern station of the same name is now a stop on the Marmaray commuter rail service to Gebze.

The station was originally built in 1876 by the Ottoman government as part of the railway from Istanbul to İzmit. A small two-story wooden station house was built and is currently on the northern part of the station.

References

Railway stations in Istanbul Province
Railway stations opened in 1872
Transport in Kadıköy
1872 establishments in the Ottoman Empire
First Turkish National architecture